Widikum is a town and capital of the Widikum-Boffe district in Cameroon. It also serves as the Ambazonian capital of Midland State. Home to the Widikum Tribe, it is located in  Momo County in northwestern Cameroon . Within the district, the town has a population of 28 152 (2005).  The town is located at the meeting point of the Momo and Man River.

It is also the homeland of Ambazonian lawyer and activist, Fon Gorji Dinka.

History

In 2019,  Ambazonian separatist, General Sebastian, as he was popularly called, was killed during a military raid on his camp in Widikum on the January 5th. Security sources reported that 17 separatist fighters were killed in the course of the raid while several weapons were seized and the camp completely destroyed. However, sources within the separatist movement dispute the figures portrayed by the army and say only ‘General Sebastian’ was killed in the course of the attack as his ‘soldiers’ fell back and took cover.

Government
The villages are ruled by traditional structures under the leadership of the chief or Ofon. The quarter(neighborhood) is governed by a quarter-head and all family heads, while the village is ruled by the village council.

References

Populated places in Northwest Region (Cameroon)